Alacahüyük is a village in the Alaca District of Çorum Province in Turkey. Its population is 250 (2022). Before the 2013 reorganisation, it was a township (belde).

References

Villages in Alaca District